Laura A. Potter is a United States Army lieutenant general currently serving as the deputy chief of staff for intelligence (G-2) of the United States Army. Previously, she was the commanding general of the United States Army Intelligence Center of Excellence.

References

Year of birth missing (living people)
Living people
Place of birth missing (living people)
Dickinson College alumni
Georgetown University alumni
Naval War College alumni
United States Army personnel of the Iraq War
United States Army personnel of the War in Afghanistan (2001–2021)
Recipients of the Defense Superior Service Medal
Recipients of the Legion of Merit
United States Army generals
Lieutenant generals